The keteriya is a form of battle axe that was used in ancient Sri Lanka. A keteriya would consist of a single edge and a short handle made of wood, traditionally resembling a hatchet with a straight shaft. This would allow the user to wield it with a single hand. Commonly used as a weapon and a tool, it is still common in rural villages. Legend has it that it was the preferred weapon of the famous warrior King Gajabahu the First; as such it is part of the cap badge of the Gajaba Regiment of the Sri Lanka Army.

References

See also
Tomahawk (axe)

Weapons of Sri Lanka
Blade weapons
Axes
Ancient weapons
Throwing axes